The Mannheimer Akte (Mannheim Act) (officially : Revised Rhine Navigation Act of 17 October 1868) is an international agreement that regulates vessel traffic on the Rhine. The principles of the Treaty are:-
 Free shipping
 Equal treatment of sailors and fleet
 Exemption from shipping charges
 Simplified customs clearance
 Obligation to maintain the Rhine's banks
 Standardization of ship safety and ship traffic regulations
 A single jurisdiction for shipping matters and the establishment of the Rhine waterway courts
 Establishing a commission to monitor these principles

History
1648: Free shipping on the Rhine was first settled, in the Peace of Westphalia, but could not prevail in practice.
1815: Called the Final Act of the Congress of Vienna, the freedom of navigation of international waters of the Rhine and the establishment of a commission.
1816: This Central Commission for the Navigation of the Rhine first met in Mainz, Germany.
31 March 1831: The Mainzer Akte was agreed to.
1861: The Commission was transferred to Mannheim.
17 October 1868: The Convention of Mannheim was signed by Baden, Bavaria, France, Hesse, the Netherlands and Prussia, valid in its principles today.
1919: It was changed by the Treaty of Versailles Article 355 of the Convention of Mannheim.
1920: The headquarters of the Commission was moved to Strasbourg.
1963: An agreement was confirmed with the principles of the Mannheim Act (enacted in 1967) and Switzerland was a signatory.

It is now implemented by the Central Commission for Navigation on the Rhine

Mannheim
1868 in law
Agreements
Water transport in Germany
Rhine
History of transport in Germany